Raid the Cage or Kluv Hazahav,, is an Israeli game show, where couples complete trivia and physical challenges to haul prizes from a gigantic cage before the doors slam shut. The original version aired on Channel 2 (Reshet), and hosted by Avi Kushnir. The show is distributed worldwide by Sony Pictures Television International.

Format
Contestants in a pair face nine different rounds. One partner answers trivia questions on various topics, each question is worth a certain time in a cage with various prizes. The purpose of the challenger is to answer all nine questions and successfully complete the game, while providing maximum time to the partner each round to get as many prizes as possible.

Gameplay
Inside the cage are various prizes with different values. There are ten rounds, in each round, one contestant must answer trivia questions and the other contestant must get in the cage to collect prizes.

Answer the question
At the start of each round, the answerer is asked a trivia question with four options, which that contestant must answer correctly. Choosing the correct answer, the cage door will open, allowing the other contestant to get in the cage to start collecting prizes. That player may answer the question immediately, or use one of the lifelines:

Switch the Question: The question is replaced, and the answers remain the same (some international versions also changes the answers).
Switch Roles: Swapping two contestants for that round only. The contestant who gets the cage prizes answers the question and if the answer is correct, the contestant that answers the trivia questions gets inside the cage to collect prizes. Both contestants then return the original roles.

Correctly answering the question, the cage door will open for a certain amount of time (10 seconds for round 1, 20 seconds for round 2 and so on, up to 90 seconds for round 9). While answering in the first nine rounds, this contestant may not discuss with the prize-collecting contestant.

In the final round (tenth round), both contestants may discuss with each other to answer one final question, the Cage Question. If they managed to answer this question correctly, they automatically win all prizes in the cage.

Giving an incorrect answer at any point ends the game, and the pair loses all prizes accumulated up to that point.

Collect prizes
If the answerer answers the question correctly, the cage door will open for a certain amount of time (10 seconds for round 1, 20 seconds for round 2 and so on, up to 90 seconds for round 9). The prize collector may choose between regular prizes that may be collected immediately, while some larger prizes may require completing a physical challenge before collecting.

Both contestants may consult in this phase, but there are no timekeeping devices to keep track of time. The prize-collecting contestant must pay attention to the time remaining and get out of the cage before the cage door closes.

At the end of the time limit, the door will close. If the contestant is still trapped in the cage, the game is over and the pair loses all prizes accumulated up to that point.

In the final round (tenth round), the contestant may consult with the answerer for the Cage Question. If they managed to answer this question correctly, they automatically win all prizes in the cage.

Ending the game
After collecting prizes for the fifth round, the pair may choose to retire from the game with all prizes collected or continue playing. Both contestants can consult the option they choose. If they choose to continue, they may also retire from the game after any later round, provided that they have completed both the answer phase and the prize-collecting phase for that round.

Giving an incorrect answer at any point or failing to get out of the cage at the end of the time allotted ends the game and the pair loses all prizes accumulated up to that point.

Tasks

For great prizes like a new car, tickets to Europe and appliances, the contestants have various tasks (in original version and some foreign versions):

Electrical appliances: Star Task - the challenger on the cage must jump on the touch screen. On every star he steps on, he gets a star, and on every red square he steps on, he loses a star. When eight stars are collected, a stroller with Electrical appliances is freed, and the contestant can get it out of the cage.
ATV: Hamster task - the challenger must run on a big hamster wheel to reveal a key to open the lock of the ATV and the contestant could get it out.
Motorcycle: Safe task - the challenger to go to the strongboxes which have questions related to both team members. A correct answer opens the box and reveals the following question. which opened three safes safe third has a key to open the lock of the bike and the challenger can take it out (the same task can be performed With a diamond ring in the case of couples).
Sailing a variety of destinations around the world: mission suitcases - the contenders to take a cart and assign it the bags and take them out that has cruise.
Car task: Superhero Task - the challenger must face the screen and make flight movements. when he sees a car he/she should smash the glass three times so the car is released and he/she can take it. Normally there's a person sit inside to drive and turn the car to the right way.
 Bathroom task: bubble task - the contestant should look for a bubble with a key that can open the box between all the bubbles and get the bathroom.
Living items: balloon task - The contestant must bounce on a seat to inflate the balloon to explode so he/she can take the key to open the box that awards the challenger the living room.
Vacation abroad: Bicycle task - The contestant must ride on a bike simulator that its map simulates a section of Rome, so he/she can take a globe and win the vacation.

The tasks are varied among the broadcasting countries, for example, in the Chinese version, there is a real "Angry Birds" game in the center of the studio.

International versions
 Non-broadcast pilot

Note: In the Chinese edition since summer 2014, Zhang Chunye, a female 22-year-old presenter currently working for Jiangsu TV will be the host of the show's Monday edition. Zhang is also the franchise's first ever female host around the world.

In the Vietnamese edition, the show was first named Vừng ơi mở cửa, later in 2018, the show renamed Đào thoát.

Top Prize winners
Note: The table is currently not complete, and still refreshing.

See also
Cash and Carry
Shop 'til You Drop
Supermarket Sweep

References

Israeli game shows
2013 Israeli television series debuts
2014 Israeli television series endings
Television series by Sony Pictures Television